Congo-Ubangi District, was a district of the Belgian Congo created in 1933 in the Coquilhatville Province. It had been dissolved by 1954.

Location

The original four provinces of the Belgian Congo had considerable autonomy, but in 1933 they were reorganized into six provinces, named after their capitals, and the central government assumed more control.
Équateur Province was renamed Coquilhatville Province after the capital city of Coquilhatville.
A map of the 1933 administrative divisions shows Bangala District and Ubangi District had been merged to form Congo-Ubangi District, named after the Congo River, which flowed through the south of the district and the Ubangi River along its north west boundary.
Congo-Ubangi District faced French territories across the Ubangi River.
It adjoined Uele District to the east, Stanleyville District to the southeast, and Tshuapa District to the south.

Coquilhatville Province was renamed Équateur Province in 1947. By 1954 it had again been divided into Equateur, Tshuapa, Mongala, Ubangi.
Mongala and Ubangi roughly corresponded to the former Bangala and Ubangi districts that made up Congo-Ubangi District.
Today the region is divided into the Mongala, Nord-Ubangi and Sud-Ubangi provinces.

Maps

See also

Districts of the Belgian Congo

References

Sources

 

Districts of the Belgian Congo
Districts of Équateur (former province)